Let Me Introduce My Friends is the first full-length album from the Swedish band I'm from Barcelona.

Track listing

References

2006 debut albums
I'm from Barcelona albums